The Wingtra WingtraOne is a tail-sitting vertical take-off and landing unmanned aerial vehicle developed in Switzerland by Wingtra AG. Powered by two electric motors, it is designed primarily for use in precision agriculture and surveying roles, or for light payload delivery to rural areas.

Design and development
In 2013, development of WingtraOne began under the name "PacFlyer" as a "Focus Project" at the Autonomous Systems Lab at ETH Zurich, under the guidance of Roland Siegwart. The product was spun off to a division also named Wingtra.

The main focus of the design effort was on controllability, traditionally a challenge in the design of a tail-sitter aircraft, particularly due to attitude estimation. The flight controller for WingtraOne was developed by 2016, which used a pitot tube, inertial navigation system consisting of multiple gyroscopes, accelerometers, and magnetometers, and GPS; the WingtraOne design was also modified for improved resistance to wind during that year, and the control algorithm to ensure smooth transition from vertical flight to forward flight was developed.

In March 2016, a prototype was shown at the CeBIT technology show in Hanover, Germany.

Following the completion of development and flight trials, the WingtraOne entered series production in 2017; the drone was officially launched in China and the United States later that year. In October 2017, Wingtra AG entered a partnership with Pix4D, a photogrammetry company, to offer postprocessing of images along with aerial data collection.

The WingtraOne has a flying wing configuration; the drone has an endurance of 55 minutes, power being provided by an eight-cell lithium-ion battery to two electric motors. A tail-sitter, the aircraft takes off vertically while being supported by wing and tail fins, and once in flight, it tilts forward to fly horizontally.

Operational history
It has been trialled in the aerial surveying, agriculture and glacier monitoring roles, as well as light payload delivery to rural areas.

The WingtraOne was awarded the Swiss Excellence Product Award in 2016.

Specifications

References

External links
 

WingtraOne
2010s Swiss civil utility aircraft
Tailsitter aircraft
Unmanned aerial vehicles of Switzerland
Flying wings
Twin-motored electric aircraft
Aircraft first flown in 2015
Twin piston-engined tractor aircraft